School District 08 is a defunct Canadian school district in New Brunswick.  It was an Anglophone district operating 36 public schools (gr. K-12) in Saint John and parts of Kings and Queens Counties.  Enrollment was approximately 13,000 students.  District 08 is headquartered in Saint John.  In 2012 it was amalgamated into Anglophone South School District.

List of schools

High schools

 Harbour View
 Saint John High
 Simonds High
 St. Malachy's Memorial
 Woodlawn Alternative Learning Centre

Middle schools

 Barnhill Memorial
 Bayside
 Beaconsfield
 Lorne
 River Valley

Elementary schools

 Bayview
 Brown's Flat
 Centennial
 Champlain Heights
 Glen Falls
 Grand Bay
 Havelock
 Inglewood
 Island View
 Lakewood Heights
 Loch Lomond
 M. Gerald Teed Memorial
 Morna Heights
 Seawood
 St. Patrick's
 St. Rose
 Westfield School

Combined elementary and middle schools

 Forest Hills
 Fundy Shores
 Hazen-White-St. Francis
 Millidgeville North
 Prince Charles
 Princess Elizabeth
 St. John the Baptist/King Edward
 St. Martins

External links
 Official Website

Former school districts in New Brunswick
Education in Saint John, New Brunswick
Education in Saint John County, New Brunswick
Education in Kings County, New Brunswick
Education in Queens County, New Brunswick